The Welsh Amateur Championship is an annual snooker competition played in Wales and is the highest ranking and most prestigious amateur event in Wales.

The competition was first established back in 1928 which was won by J. Emrys Harries. The championship is currently held by Rhydian Richards. Tom Jones is the most successful player in the tournaments history winning the championship 8 times over a 17-year period.

Currently former champions Daniel Wells, Duane Jones, Dominic Dale, Michael White, Ryan Day, Jackson Page and Jamie Jones are all playing on the world tour.

Winners

Stats

Finalists

References

Snooker amateur competitions
Recurring sporting events established in 1928
Snooker competitions in Wales
1928 establishments in Wales
National championships in Wales